Abas unipunctata is a species of achilid planthopper in the family Achilidae. It is the only known species in the genus Abas. The genus and species were described by Ronald Gordon Fennah in 1950. It was described on the basis of a single female collected at Senahú, Alta Verapaz in Guatemala. The genus is distinguished from similar taxa in the tribe Plectoderini by the shape of the edges of the frons and pronotal disk.

References

Insects described in 1950
Insects of Central America
Achilidae